The Daily Bruin is the student newspaper at the University of California, Los Angeles. It began publishing in 1919, the year UCLA was founded.

The Daily Bruin distributes about 6,000 copies across campus each school day. It also publishes PRIME, a quarterly arts, culture and lifestyle magazine, and Bruinwalk.com, a professor, class and apartment review website.

Frequency and governance

The Bruin is published Monday through Friday during the school year, twice a week during the last week of the quarter, once a week during finals week, and once a week on Mondays in the summer quarter. The Bruins staff also publishes PRIME, a quarterly lifestyle magazine, and maintains Bruinwalk.com, a professor and apartment review site.

It is published by the ASUCLA Communications Board, which sets policies for the newspaper and other campus communications media. The current editor in chief is Melissa Morris.

The Daily Bruin has 13 editorial departments: news writing, sports writing, arts & entertainment writing, opinion writing, blogging, infographic reporting, digital development, video journalism, copy editing, photojournalism, design, PRIME, enterprise reporting and cartoons and illustrations.

Location
The Daily Bruin office and newsroom is located on the first floor of Kerckhoff Hall, Room 118.

History

Nomenclature

The Daily Bruin was preceded by the weekly Normal Outlook on the campus of UCLA's predecessor, the Los Angeles State Normal School, from 1910 through 1918 or 1919 (the records are incomplete).

Upon the establishment in fall 1919 of the Southern Branch of the University of California, as UCLA was first known, the twice-weekly Cub Californian was first issued on Sept. 29, 1919.  Its name was changed to the California Grizzly with the issue of March 21, 1924, and on Sept. 13, 1925 it began to publish five days a week.

On October 22, 1926, the newspaper became known as the California Daily Bruin.<ref>[http://www.uclahistoryproject.ucla.edu/Fun/ThisMonth_OctHailBruins.asp "This Month in History," UCLA History Project]</ref> During World War II it reduced its publication frequency to three times a week under the title California Bruin, reverting to a daily publication at war's end. On  April 2, 1948, the name was changed to UCLA Daily Bruin.Control

The newspaper has generally been under control of the student organization now known as the Associated Students UCLA, or ASUCLA, although during the summer sessions of the 1920s and 1930s the newspapers were used as laboratory papers for university journalism classes. A student body president in 1931 advocated that the Bruin be made independent from control by the ASUC, as it was known then, so it might act as a check on student government. In the 1950s, the Summer Bruin was again taken over by the Administration, and '"controversial social issues" were banned from print during the summers.

Until 1955, the Associated Students was considered the publisher of the Daily Bruin, sometimes directly under the student council and sometimes with the interposition of a Publications Board. Editors were named by the student council. This system resulted in frequent political struggles between the staff (which nominated candidates for the key editorial positions) and the student council.

During the height of the McCarthy era, with the newspaper staff being accused of Communist leanings, the university administration in 1955 revised the governance of the paper and instituted a system whereby the student body itself elected the editor (see below). "Editors had to run for elective office just like politicians, and the newspaper was closely controlled by the [student] Council," wrote William C. Ackerman, the ASUCLA graduate administrator.

The practice of student election of editors ended in 1963 with the establishment of the ASUCLA Communications Board, a student-led organization that selects the editors of the Bruin as well as the editors for the other seven newsmagazines and UCLA Radio.

The 1920s

In 1926, editor John F. Cohee was expelled from school by Ernest Carroll Moore, the campus administrator and director, for what Moore called "certain indecent statements which affront the good name of the women of the University." These were apparently a tongue-in-cheek "report" that some sorority women had been seen cavorting nude in the Pacific Ocean surf. This article was included in a twice-yearly burlesque edition of the Daily Bruin known as "Hell's Bells." (Cohee transferred to the Berkeley campus and graduated there in 1927. He later went on to become a professional reporter.)

Three years later, Director Moore suspended 14 students for publishing the January 23, 1929, issue of "Hell's Bells," "the filthiest and most indecent piece of printed matter that any of us has ever seen." Some of those students were later reinstated. That was the last issue of "Hell's Bells."

The 1930s

 1935. The student council named Gilbert Harrison as editor. Harrison was soon at loggerheads with Tom Lambert, the ASUC president, who wanted more coverage of the student government. Frustrated, Lambert resigned, and the council named a committee to publish the paper when the staff threatened to strike. Lambert returned to his job.
 1938. The council named a salaried director of publications who would be responsible for all content, but in October a newly chosen council decided that the appointee would have no editorial control.
 1939. The student leaders adopted a resolution requiring the Bruin to deny publicity to "all unrecognized organizations." The editor called the action an "unwarranted restriction of press freedom," and four thousand students signed petitions opposing the restriction, which was repealed.

The 1940s

In October 1944 the student president charged that the Bruin was "unrepresentative and self-perpetuating" and that it was controlled by the liberal American Youth for Democracy. The staff threatened to strike but found that the president had already sketched out a plan for substitute staffers, so it refrained.

The 1950s

Charges of left-wing influence

In spring 1949 Jim Garst and Clancy Sigal were nominated by the Bruin staff as editor and managing editor. Some student leaders charged that the two favored leftist positions. Garst was chosen editor by the student council, but Sigal (who had been asked by a member of the council whether he was "a Communist") was rejected. The staffers refused to work over the summer, and in the fall a new council approved Sigal. The same council, however, refused to reappoint him in the spring 1950 term. A student vote rejected Sigal, 2,272 to 676.

In the spring semester 1951, President Robert Gordon Sproul wrote Provost Clarence Dykstra that he had received letters "pouring in" about opinion columns written by student Art Janov (later the author of The Primal Scream), "including one from the governor's office.... I do hope that some way will be found to keep this young man from using the feature page of the Bruin as a medium for propaganda of the party line." On February 13, 1951, Dean Hahn replied in a memo to Dykstra that "we are still looking for an editor with more moderate leanings."

The student council turned down the staff's nomination of Jerry Schlapik as editor for the spring 1951 term in favor of conservative Bob Strock, who was then deemed ineligible because of a low grade-point average. On February 7, 1951, the council appointed Martin Brower as editor but also chose Rex Rexrode, a non-staffer, as feature (opinion) editor. Brower immediately submitted his resignation, and the entire non-sports editorial staff resigned. Most of them returned to work in two weeks after the council agreed that, from then on, all top editors would be chosen from the newspaper's senior staff.

 Student election of editors 

On November 23, 1954, President Robert Gordon Sproul approved a new student-election plan for the newspaper. Dean of Students Milton E. Hahn sent a memorandum to UCLA Chancellor Raymond B. Allen on December 7. 1954.  He wrote:

Editor Martin McReynolds caught word of the plan and published an editorial on December 8, stating that "Someone, probably the Administration, has been planning this change for at least six weeks. The planning has all been kept secret from The Daily Bruin and the students at large." On the same day, Hahn submitted the plan to the Student Council.

The plan required that:
Non-staff opinion pieces would be limited to 150 words in the letters column.
Controversial articles would be "matched" with an opposing opinion.
Editorial columns "shall be used by the editor-in-chief in any manner consonant with journalistic practice and the wishes of SLC [Student Legislative Council] subject to the contribution that contributors be bona fide staff members or members of SLC."

A total of 3,004 signatures, representing one-fifth of the student body, were collected for a petition to be sent to Sproul to retract the plan. The number of signatures was about a thousand more than the number of votes in the preceding student-body election.

The Bruin staff nominated six candidates to become editors the following year, but all six were rejected by the selection committee appointed to decide on the new editors.

21st Century

In 2013, the Daily Bruin's publisher laid off most of its full-time employees, following more than a decade of consistently declining advertising revenues that reflected the national newspaper industry. Despite layoffs, it retained UCLA Student Media Director Doria Deen, editorial advisor Abigail Goldman and Business Manager Jeremy Wildman.

In spring 2016, UCLA's student body voted in favor of the "Daily Bruin and Bruinwalk.com Referendum," which guaranteed student fees to support the Bruin as its print advertising revenues continue to decline.

Stonewall

In 2013, the Daily Bruin created the "Stonewall" as an online record of sources who "stonewalled," or refused to speak, with reporters. The "Stonewall" was created in effort to maintain transparency with readers about individuals in the community who thwarted Daily Bruin reporters' attempts at providing information. The most recent stone added to the "Stonewall" was on June 5, 2019, when the UCLA media relations office for several weeks delayed an interview with administrators regarding a professor's conviction of child sexual abuse.

The Stack

Data editor Neil Bedi launched The Stack, Daily Bruin's data journalism and newsroom tech blog, in March 2015. Articles analyze public data and present them with accompanying quantitative graphics and visualizations. Previous projects include examining the data of the mandatory Undergraduate Students Association Council (USAC) student fees over time, funding sources behind UCLA research projects, and rate of major changes among UCLA students.The Stack makes the code on its blog available under open-source licenses on GitHub.

Editor in chief

Normal Outlook
1910-1911 	Clarence Hodges, Shirley D. Burns
1911-1915 	No records available
1915-1916 	Albert T. Blanford, Gertrude C. Maloney, Willette Long, Eva Smith
1916-1917 	Lee Roy Smith, Eva Throckmorton
1917-1918 	Elizabeth Lee Polk, Nina Ehlers
1918-1919 	No records available

Cub Californian
1919-1921 	Dale Stoddard, Alice Lookabaugh, Fern Ashley, David K. Barnwell
1920-1921 	Mildred Sanborn
1921-1922 	John A. Worley
1922-1923 	Irving C. Kramer
1923 (fall) 	Irving C. Kramer

California Grizzly
1924 (spring) 	Fred M. Jordan
1924-1925 	John F. Cohee, Robert W. Kerr
1925-1926 	John F. Cohee, Ben Person

Daily Bruin
1920s
1926-1927 	William E. Forbes
1927-1928 	James F. Wickizer
1928-1929 	H. Monte Harrington, Gene Harvey
1929-1930 	Walter T. Bogart

1930s
1930-1931 	Carl Schaefer, Charles Olton
1931-1932 	Maxwell Clark
1932-1933 	George Elmendorf
1933-1934 	Robert K. Shellaby
1934-1935 	F. Chandler Harris
1935-1936 	Gilbert Harrison
1936-1937 	Stanley Rubin (In 1970, Rubin recalled that in the middle 1930s, Max Rafferty, who served from 1963 to 1971 as California Superintendent of Public Instruction, had physically attacked him over controversial content in The Bruin.  Rafferty dispatched a letter to the Los Angeles Times in which he described The Bruin as "one of the most prejudiced newspapers on the Pacific Coast" and complained that the "radicalism" of the publication "is not so funny if it keeps [students] from getting a job.")
1937-1938 	Roy Swanfeldt, Norman Borisoff
1938-1939 	William T. Brown, Everett Carter
1939-1940 	Sanford J. Mock, Richard K. Pryne

1940s
1940-1941 	Bruce Cassiday, Jack Hauptli
1941-1942 	Malcolm Steinlauf, Robert M. Barsky
1942-1943 	Tom Smith, Robert Weil, Josephine Rosenfield
1943-1944 	Adele Truitt, Charlotte Klein, Gloria Farquar
1944-1945 	Pat Campbell, Helen Licht, Doris Willens
1945-1946 	Hannah Bloom, Bill Stout, Anne Stern
1946-1947 	Ann Hebert, Frank Mankiewicz
1947-1948 	Paul Simqu, Elmer L. (Chally) Chalberg
1948-1949 	Charles G. Francis, Grover Heyler
1949-1950 	James D. Garst, Harold E. Watkins

1950s
1950-1951 	Eugene Frumkin, Jerry Schlapik (acting), Martin A. Brower
1951-1952 	Robert Myers, Peter Graber
1952-1953 	Richard Schenk, Jack Weber
1953-1954 	Albert Greenstein, M. E. Vogel
1954-1955 	Martin D. McReynolds, Irv Drasnin
1955-1956 	Martin A. Sklar, Clyde E. Rexrode
1956-1957 	Joseph E. Colmenares
1957-1958 	Edward B. Robinson
1958-1959 	Thomas A. Welch
1959-1960 	Martin A. Kasindorf

1960s
1960-1961 	Morton L. Saltzman, Charles M. Rossi
1961-1962 	Shirley Mae Folmer
1962-1963 	Alan R. Rothstein
1963-1964 	Lester G. Ostrov
1964-1965 	Philip A. Yaffe
1965-1966 	Joel E. Boxer
1966-1967     Neil Reichline
1967-1968     Brian Weiss
1968-1969     Mike Levett
1969-1970     John Parker

1970s
1970-1971    Ann Haskins
1971-1972    David Lees
1972-1973    Shelley Presser
1973-1974    Steve Ainsworth
1974-1975    Anne Pautler
1975-1976    Jim Stebinger
1976-1977    Alice Short
1977-1979    Joanne Eglash
1979-1980    Chris Cameron

1980s
1981-1982    Jesse Coronado
1982-1983    Andrew Schlei
1983-1984    Kim Cohn
1984    Katherine Jane Bleifer. Bleifer resigned under fire on Dec. 14, 1984, and was replaced in the interim by Jerry Abeles, the managing editor.
1985    William Rabkin
1985-1986    Peter Pae
1986-1987    Ronald Scott Bell
1987-1988    Penny Rosenberg
1988-1989    Nancy McCullough 
1989-1990    Valarie De La Garza

1990s
1990-1992    Matthew Fordahl
1992-1993    Leila Ansari
1993-1994    Josh Romonek
1994-1995    Matea Gold
1995-1996    Roxane Marquez
1996-1997    Patrick Kerkstra
1997-1998    Edina Lekovic
1998-1999    Adam Yamaguchi
1999-2000    Andrea Perera

2000s
2000-2001    Christine Byrd
2001-2002    Timothy Kudo
2002-2003    Cuauhtémoc Ortega
2003-2004    Kelly Rayburn
2004-2005    Tyson Evans
2005-2006    Charles Proctor
2006-2007    Jeff Schenck
2007-2008    Saba Riazati
2008-2009    Anthony Pesce
2009-2010    Alene Tchekmedyian

2010s
2010-2011    Farzad Mashhood
2011-2012    Lauren Jow
2012-2013    James Barragan
2013-2014    Jillian Beck
2014-2015    Andrew Erickson
2015-2016    Sam Hoff
2016-2017    Tanner Walters
2017-2018    Mackenzie Possee
2018-2019    Jacob Preal
2019-2020    Angie Forburger

2020s
2020-2021    Melissa Morris
2021-2022    Genesis Qu
2022-2023    Victoria Li

Awards and recognition
The Daily Bruin and its staffers earn honors at local, state, regional and national levels on an annual basis. Listed below are some of the prominent honors the Daily Bruin has received.

National
Associated Collegiate Press – Pacemaker Awards
Newspaper Pacemaker
Winner: 2019, 2016, 2014, 2011, 2004, 1990
Finalist: 2017, 2015, 2012, 2008, 2007, 2006, 2003, 1985
Online Pacemaker
Winner: 2019, 2017, 2016, 2005
Finalist: 2012, 2007
Magazine Pacemaker (for prime magazine)
Winner: 2019, 2013, 2012
Finalist: 2017, 2016

Society of Professional Journalists – National Mark of Excellence Awards
Best all-around daily student newspaper
Winner: 2006, 2004
Finalist: 2015, 2014, 2013

Regional
Society of Professional Journalists – Region 11 Mark of Excellence Awards
Best all-around daily student newspaper
Winner: 2015, 2014, 2013, 2009, 2007, 2005, 2004
Finalist: 2018, 2017, 2016, 2012, 2011, 2010, 2006
Best affiliated website
Winner: 2018, 2017, 2011, 2010
Finalist: 2015, 2014, 2013, 2012, 2006
Best student magazine
Winner: 2018
Finalist: 2017

State
California College Media Association – Excellence in Student Media Awards
General newspaper excellence
First place: 2016, 2015, 2014, 2011, 2004
Second place: 2013, 2012
General website excellence
First place: 2015, 2011, 2004
Second place: 2017, 2016, 2014, 2012
Third place: 2013
Best overall design
First place: 2015, 2014, 2012
Honorable mention: 2017

California Newspaper Publishers Association – Campus Excellence in Journalism Awards
Best four-year newspaper
First place: 2015, 2005, 2004

Local
Los Angeles Press Club – SoCal Journalism Awards
Best college newspaper
Second place: 2014
Third place: 2016, 2015, 2013
Best news website
First place: 2016, 2014
Second place: 2015Awards last updated in October 2019 Editorial Board 
The Daily Bruin Editorial Board presents the opinions of veteran staff members of the Bruin about topics relating to UCLA. It is made up of five standing members in addition to staff representatives. The board operates separately from the newsroom, and the editorials represent the majority opinion of the board. Editorials are published once or twice a week throughout the year.

Daily Bruin Hall of Fame

Class of 2000: William E. Forbes (1906–1999), class of 1927, president of the Southern California Music Co. and a regent of the University of California.
Class of 2001: Flora Lewis (1918–2002), class of 1939, foreign correspondent and columnist.
Class of 2002: Stanley Rubin (1917-2014), class of 1936, Emmy award-winning screenwriter and producer.
Class of 2003: Frank Mankiewicz (1924–2014), class of 1947, screenwriter, regional director of the Peace Corps, press attache for Sen. Robert F. Kennedy.
Class of 2004: Harry Shearer (1943– ), actor and writer
Class of 2005: Martin A. (Marty) Sklar (1934–2017),  vice chairman and principal creative executive for Walt Disney Imagineering.

Other notable alumni (chronological)

 Ralph Bunche, class of 1927, political scientist, diplomat and recipient of the 1950 Nobel Peace Prize.
 Gilbert A. Harrison (1915–2008), class of 1935, editor of the New Republic magazine.
 Togo Tanaka (1916–2009), editor of the Rafu Shimpo newspaper, later sent to the Manzanar internment camp.
 Clancy Sigal (1926–2017), class of 1950, writer.
 Bill Stout (1927–1989), KNXT-TV newsman.
 Gene Frumkin (1928–2007), class of 1951, journalist, poet and professor.
 Carol Burnett (1933– ), American actress, singer, writer and comedian
 Fredy Perlman (1934–1985), class of 1955, author, publisher and activist.
 Jerry Farber (1935– ), English professor and author of The Student as Nigger.Art Spander, class of 1960, American sportswriter and columnist, inducted into the Rose Bowl Hall of Fame in 2016.
 Tony Auth (1942–2014), class of 1965, Pulitzer Prize-winning cartoonist for The Philadelphia Inquirer David Shaw (1943–2005), class of 1965, Pulitzer Prize-winning writer for the Los Angeles Times who was known for his media criticism.
 Sondhi Limthongkul (1947– ), Thai journalist and opposition leader.
 Gary Knell, class of 1975, president and CEO of National Geographic Society; former CEO of NPR and Sesame Workshop.
 Steve Hartman (sportscaster), class of 1980, sportscaster for KLAC Radio and KCBS Television.
 Jay Samit, class of 1982, digital media innovator and entrepreneur.
Frank Spotnitz, class of 1982, executive producer of The X-Files.David Kahn (sports executive), class of 1983, former president of basketball operations for the Minnesota Timberwolves.
 Doug Chiang, class of 1986, Winner of the 1993 Academy Award for Best Visual Effects. Vice president and executive creative director of Lucasfilm.
 Cari Champion, class of 1998, American broadcast journalist and sports television personality.
Ben Shapiro, class of 2004, American conservative political commentator.If not cited here, references can be found within the articles.''

Notes and references

See also 
List of student newspapers

External links 
 Daily Bruin website
 University of California History Digital Archives, for partial list of editors



Newspapers published in Greater Los Angeles
University of California, Los Angeles
Student newspapers published in California
Daily newspapers published in California